Chelae is the plural of Chela (organ).

Chelae or Chelai may also refer to:
Chelae (Bithynia), an ancient town of Bithynia
Chelae (Bosphorus), an ancient town of Bithynia
Chelae (Thrace), an ancient town of Thrace